The Fulmar Gas Line is a natural gas pipeline which transports natural gas from the central North Sea to St Fergus, Scotland.  Originally, the pipeline carried natural gas from Fulmar and Clyde fields. Later also other fields in the Central North Sea, such as Kittiwake, Gannet, Nelson, Anasuria, Curlew, and Triton were connected to the pipeline.
 
It has capacity of  wet natural gas per year. The pipeline commenced operation in May 1986. It is owned and operated by Shell U.K. Limited and Esso Exploration and Production UK Limited.

References

1986 establishments in Scotland
Energy infrastructure completed in 1986
ExxonMobil buildings and structures
Natural gas pipelines in the United Kingdom
North Sea energy
Oil and gas industry in Scotland
Shell plc buildings and structures
Pipelines under the North Sea